GHB or gamma-hydroxybutyric acid is a naturally-occurring neurotransmitter and a psychoactive drug.

GHB may also refer to:
 GHB Records, an American record label
 Gabo d'Hirutho d'Bethnahrin, Assyrian-Syriac party
 Gerakan Harapan Baru, a political movement in Malaysia
 Governor's Harbour Airport's IATA code
 Good Humor-Breyers, Unilever's American ice cream division